Montclair station could refer to:
 Walnut Street station (NJ Transit) in Montclair, New Jersey, formerly named Montclair
 Montclair Transcenter in Montclair, California

See also
 Montclair State University station, New Jersey
 Upper Montclair station, New Jersey